Tony Earley (born 1961) is an American novelist and short story writer.  He was born in San Antonio, Texas, but grew up in North Carolina.  His stories are often set in North Carolina.

Earley studied English at Warren Wilson College and after graduation in 1983, he spent four years as a reporter in North Carolina, first as a general assignment reporter for The Thermal Belt News Journal in Columbus, and then as sports editor and feature writer at The Daily Courier in Forest City. Later he attended the University of Alabama in Tuscaloosa, where he received an MFA in creative writing.  He quickly found success writing short stories, first with smaller literary magazines, then with Harper's, which published two of his stories: "Charlotte" in 1992 and "The Prophet From Jupiter" in 1993. The latter story helped Harper's win a National Magazine Award for fiction in 1994.

In 1996, Earley's short stories earned him a place on Granta'''s list of the "20 Best Young American Novelists", and shortly after that announcement, The New Yorker featured him in an issue that focused on the best new novelists in America.  He has twice been included in the annual Best American Short Stories anthology.  His writing style has been compared by critics to writers as distant as a young Ernest Hemingway and E. B. White.  One of his favorite writers is Willa Cather.

On May 15, 2010 Earley gave a humorous commencement speech at Warren Wilson College. He was inducted into the Fellowship of Southern Writers in 2010.
He lives with his wife and two daughters in Nashville, Tennessee, where he is the Samuel Milton Fleming Professor of English at Vanderbilt University.

Bibliography

NovelsJim the Boy (2000, Little Brown)The Blue Star (2008, Little Brown). This is the sequel to Jim the Boy. It picks up the story when Jim is a senior in high school.

Collections
Here We Are in Paradise (1994)
Mr. Tall (2014)

Essays and reporting
 Somehow Form a Family: Stories That are Mostly True (2001)

Speeches and interviewsCommencement at Warren Wilson College: A great class hears a great address'' (2010)

References

1961 births
Living people
Vanderbilt University faculty
20th-century American novelists
The New Yorker people
Writers from San Antonio
Novelists from North Carolina
Novelists from Tennessee
American male novelists
American male short story writers
20th-century American short story writers
20th-century American male writers
Novelists from Texas